The Victoria's Secret Fashion Show is an annual fashion show sponsored by Victoria's Secret, a brand of lingerie and sleepwear. Victoria's Secret uses the show to promote and market its goods in high-profile settings. The show features some of the world's leading fashion models, such as current Victoria's Secret Angels Tyra Banks, Heidi Klum, Gisele Bündchen, and Adriana Lima.

The Victoria's Secret Fashion Show 2003 was recorded in New York City, United States at the 69th Regiment Armory. The show featured musical performances by Sting, Mary J. Blige, and Eve. Angel Heidi Klum was wearing the Victoria's Secret Fantasy Bra : Very Sexy Fantasy Bra worth $11,000,000.

Fashion show segments

Segment 1: Sexy Super Heroines

Segment 2: Razor Sharp Latex Ladies

Special Performance

Segment 3 : Rock Chicks Rockin' Out

Special Performance

Segment 4 : Sexy Kittens

Special Performance

Segment 5 : Glaaaaamaaazons

Index

Finale

Angels: Adriana Lima, Gisele Bündchen, Tyra Banks, Heidi Klum.

Returning Models: Michelle Alves, Alessandra Ambrosio, Carmen Kass, Dewi Driegen, Naomi Campbell, Ana Beatriz Barros, Angela Lindvall, Frankie Rayder, Mini Andén, Eugenia Volodina, Oluchi Onweagba, Liya Kebede, Lindsay Frimodt, Fernanda Tavares, Letícia Birkheuer, Ujjwala Raut, Karolina Kurkova.

Newcomers: Isabeli Fontana, Marcelle Bittar, Jacquetta Wheeler, Margarita Svegzdaite, Deanna Miller.

External links 

 VSFS 2003 Gallery

Victoria's Secret
2003 in fashion